Divishon Honor – Bonaire or known as Kampionato (literally [the football] championship ) is the top association football league in Bonaire, a special municipality of the Netherlands in the Caribbean. The top two teams in this competition competed in the Netherlands Antilles Championship until the dissolution of the Netherlands Antilles in 2010.

Current Clubs
There are currently 10 teams in the Bonaire League:

Arriba Perú (Kralendijk)
Atlétiko Flamingo (Nikiboko)
Atlétiko Tera Corá ( ATC), (Tera Corá)
SV Real Rincon (Rincon)
SV Estrellas (Nort Saliña Kunuku Bieu)
SV Juventus (Antriòl)
SV Uruguay (Antriòl)
SV Vespo (Rincon)
SV Vitesse (Antriòl)
SV Young Boys (Kralendijk)

Previous winners
Previous winners are:

1960-61 : SV Deportivo
1961-62 : SV Estrellas
1962-63: SV Estrellas
1963-64 : SV Estrellas
1964-65 : not held
1965-66 : SV Estrellas
1966-67 : not held
1967-68 : SV Vitesse
1968-69 : SV Vitesse
1969-70 : SV Vitesse
1970-71 : SV Vitesse
1971-72 : SV Real Rincon
1973 : SV Real Rincon
1973-74 : not held
1974-75 : SV Estrellas
1976 : SV Juventus
1977 : SV Juventus
1978 : SV Estrellas
1979 : SV Real Rincon
1980-81 : SV Vitesse
1982 : not held
1983 : SV Uruguay
1984 : SV Juventus
1984-85 : SV Juventus
1986 : SV Real Rincon
1987 : SV Juventus
1988 : SV Estrellas
1989 : SV Juventus
1990–91 : SV Vitesse
1991–92 : SV Juventus
1992–93 : SV Vitesse
1993–94 : SV Juventus
1994–95 : SV Vespo
1996 : Real Rincon
1997 : Real Rincon
1998–99 : SV Estrellas
2000–01 : Real Rincon
2001–02 : SV Estrellas
2002–03 : Real Rincon
2003–04 : Real Rincon
2004–05 : SV Juventus
2005–06 : Real Rincon
2006–07 : SV Vespo
2007–08 : SV Juventus
2009 : SV Juventus
2010 : SV Juventus
2011 : not held
2012 : SV Juventus
2013 : SV Juventus
2014 : Real Rincon
2015–16: Atlétiko Flamingo
2016–17: Real Rincon
2017–18: Real Rincon
2018–19: Real Rincon
2019–20: season abandoned after round 11
2021: Real Rincon
2022: Real Rincon

Top winners (League, titles)

Top scorers

References

 
Football competitions in Bonaire
Football competitions in the Netherlands Antilles
Top level football leagues in the Caribbean